Franz Theodor Csokor (6 September 1885–5 January 1969) was an Austrian author and dramatist, particularly well known for his Expressionist dramas. His most successful and best-known piece is 3. November 1918, about the downfall of the Austria-Hungary monarchy. In many of his works Csokor deals with themes of antiquity and Christianity.

Life 
Csokor was born into a respectable middle-class family in Vienna. (The name Csokor is Hungarian and means bunch [of flowers]). He started on a course of art history, but did not finish it. From early on he felt a calling to be a dramatist, and composed his first pieces before World War I. He spent 1913–14 in Saint Petersburg.

During World War I he was a soldier, and was latterly employed in the War Archives

From 1922 to 1928 Csokor was the dramaturgist at the Raimundtheater and at the Deutsches Volkstheater in Vienna.

From 1933 he was already a decided opponent of National Socialism and signed a document saying so at the PEN congress in Dubrovnik. In 1938, after the annexation of Austria to Germany, he emigrated voluntarily, and after travelling via Poland, Romania and Hungary, ended up in Italy in 1944, where he lived in Rome. He worked for the BBC and returned to Vienna in 1946 in British uniform.

In 1947 Csokor became president of the Austrian PEN Club, with which he remained actively associated until well into his old age. In 1968 he also became vice-president of the International PEN.

As a convinced humanist Csokor spoke up in his dramas for peace, freedom and human rights. His creative life was also closely connected with the Labour movement.

Csokor was awarded the title of Professor.

He died in Vienna, and is buried in a grave of honour in the Zentralfriedhof. The Csokorgasse, a street in Vienna, was named after him in 1975. In 1994 the Austrian Post Office published a special stamp in his honour.

Decorations and awards 
 1937 Golden Laurel of the Warsaw Academy of Letters
 1937 Gold Cross of Merit (Poland)
 1937 Burgtheater ring
 1938 Grillparzer Prize
 1953 Literary Prize of the City of Vienna
 1955 Ring of Honour of the City of Vienna
 1955 Grand Austrian State Prize for Literature
 1960 Golden Pen
 1961 Honorary Member of the Press Club Concordia
 1965 Austrian Decoration for Science and Art

Works

Theatrical pieces 

 Die rote Straße, 1918
 Die Stunde des Absterbens, 1919
 Gesellschaft der Menschenrechte, 1929
 Besetztes Gebiet, 1930
 3. November 1918, 1936; Ephelant 1993. .
 Gottes General, 1939; Ephelant 1993. .
 Kalypso, 1942
 Der verlorene Sohn, 1943; Ephelant 1993. .
 Cäsars Witwe, 1954
 Pilatus, 1954
 Hebt den Stein ab, 1957
 Jadwiga, 1966
 Der tausendjährige Traum, 1966
 Alexander, 1969
 Der Kaiser zwischen den Zeiten, 1969

Prose 

 Hildebrands Heimkehr, eine deutsche Sage, 1905
 Schuß ins Geschäft (Der Fall Otto Eißler), 1925
 Über die Schwelle, short stories, 1937
 Der Schlüssel zum Abgrund, novel, 1955
 Der zweite Hahnenschrei, short stories, 1959
 Ein paar Schaufeln Erde, short stories, 1965
 Auch heute noch nicht an Land. Briefe und Gedichte aus dem Exil. With Das schwarze Schiff and Zeuge einer Zeit. Ephelant 1993. .

Lyric poetry 

 Die Gewalten, 1912
 Der Dolch und die Wunde, 1917
 Ewiger Aufbruch, 1926
 Das schwarze Schiff, 1945, 1947; 1993
 Immer ist Anfang, 1952

Autobiography 
 Als Zivilist im polnischen Krieg, Allert de Lange, Amsterdam 1940
 Als Zivilist im Balkankrieg, Ullstein, Vienna 1947
 new edition ed. Franz Richard Reiter. Ephelant, Vienna 2000. 
 Auf fremden Straßen, Desch, Vienna 1955
 Zeuge einer Zeit: Briefe aus dem Exil 1933–1950, Langen-Müller, Munich 1955
 Autobiographical sketch by Franz Theodor Csokor, ca. 1914 for Franz Brümmer; In: Digital Edition of the lexicographic papers from the literary estate of Franz Brümmer

References 

 Lilly Adler: Die dramatischen Werke von Franz Theodor Csokor. Vienna: university dissertation 1950.
 Joseph P. Strelka (ed.): Immer ist Anfang. Der Dichter Franz Theodor Csokor. Lang, Frankfurt am Main and elsewhere. 1990. .
 Eckart Früh: F. Th. Csokor, ein Frondeur. In: 3. November 1918. Der verlorene Sohn. Gottes General., Ephelant 1993, pp. 249–254. .
 Harald Klauhs: Franz Theodor Csokor. Leben und Werk bis 1938 im Überblick. Heinz, Akad. Verl., Stuttgart 1988. (= Stuttgarter Arbeiten zur Germanistik; 204) .
 Ulrich N. Schulenburg (ed.): Lebensbilder eines Humanisten. Ein Franz Theodor Csokor-Buch. Löcker, Vienna 1992. .
 Paul Wimmer: Der Dramatiker Franz Theodor Csokor. Wagner, Innsbruck 1981. (= Dramatiker, Stücke, Perspektiven; 4) .

External links 
 
 Website about Franz Theodor Csokor
 www.csokor.de SAB
 Autobiographical sketch by Franz Theodor Csokor, ca. 1914 to Franz Brümmer; In: Digital Edition of the lexicographic papers from the literary estate of Franz Brümmer
 Entry about Franz Theodor Csokor in the lexicon of the Landesmuseum Niederösterreich

Notes 

1885 births
1969 deaths
Writers from Vienna
Austrian male dramatists and playwrights
Austrian emigrants to Italy
Emigrants from Austria after the Anschluss
Expressionist dramatists and playwrights
Burials at the Vienna Central Cemetery
Recipients of the Gold Cross of Merit (Poland)
Recipients of the Grand Austrian State Prize
Recipients of the Austrian Decoration for Science and Art
20th-century Austrian dramatists and playwrights
20th-century Austrian male writers